Kudirat Ablet (born 5 February 1997) is a Chinese footballer who plays for Chinese Super League side Dalian Professional.

Club career
Kudirat Ablet would start his career playing for the Xinjiang youth team. The team would be incorporated into the Xinjiang Tianshan Leopard football club. In 2017, he represented Xinjiang Under-20 in the National Games of China. By the 2016 China League One campaign he would be promoted to the senior team. On 1 July 2016, he moved abroad to join Portuguese club Gondomar. He would make his debut in a league game on 20 September 2020 against S.C. Salgueiros in a 1-1 draw.

On 26 February 2021, he returned to China when he signed with top tier club Dalian Professional. He make his first appearance for the team in the 2021 Chinese FA Cup against China U-20 on 13 October 2021 in a 2-1 victory. He would have to wait the following season for his first league appearance for the club on 4 November 2022 against Shanghai Port F.C. in a game that ended in a 2-1 defeat.

International career 
In 2017, Kudirat was called up by the China U–20 training team.

In 2018, he played for the team in the Chongqing International Youth Tournament against Mexico.

He played in the 2019 Toulon Tournament, and had one appearance against Chile.

Career statistics
Statistics accurate as of match played 31 January 2023.

References

External links
 

1997 births
Living people
Chinese footballers
People from Ili
Footballers from Xinjiang
Dalian Professional F.C. players
Xinjiang Tianshan Leopard F.C. players
Chinese Super League players
China League One players
Association football goalkeepers